Rochlitz may refer to:

Rochlitz, town in Saxony, Germany
Rokytnice nad Jizerou (Rochlitz an der Iser), town in Northern Bohemia, Czech Republic
Johann Friedrich Rochlitz
Gustav Rochlitz